Woodridge is a village in Sullivan County, New York, United States. The population was 847 at the 2010 census. The village is in the town of Fallsburg at the junction of county routes 53, 54, 58, and 158. The Woodridge ZIP Code is 12789.

History 

The village was formerly called "Centreville". A history of the village, Centreville to Woodridge by Erna W. Elliott, was published by Exposition Press in 1976. Centreville was a station stop along the old New York, Ontario and Western Railway.

Woodridge is located in the Catskills Borscht Belt resort area. In its heyday it was home to numerous summer hotels, bungalow colonies, and boarding houses. Fallsburgh Central School's high school was in Woodridge. The last graduating class was in 1958. The new high school was built in Fallsburg.

During the 1950s, Woodridge had:

4 bars
3 hardware stores
2 dental offices
1 amusement business
6 gasoline stations
3 produce markets
2 bus lines
5 automobile repair shops
5 groceries
1 fish market
2 taxi services
2 dry cleaners
4 luncheonettes
2 drug stores
1 bank
1 movie theatre
3 clothing stores
1 liquor store
1 shoe store
1 steam laundry
2 barber shops
3 automobile dealerships
1 mattress manufacturer
3 butcher shops
2 medical doctor's offices
3 lumber yards

1- bakery- Mortmans 

In addition, there were numerous trades and professionals, including painters, a plumber, electricians, masons, carpenters, auto body repair, CPAs, architects, lawyers, flooring contractors, sign painters and chicken dealers.

A small percentage of the permanent population is still Orthodox Jewish. There are two active synagogues in Woodridge:

 Ohave Shalom Synagogue was listed on the National Register of Historic Places in 2000.
 K'hal Yerim of Woodridge on 25 Highland Avenue was founded in 1985 by the Grand Rabbi Yitzchok Lebovits.

On July 16, 2010, an eruv was erected in Woodridge under the supervision of Rabbi Yechiel Steinmetz of Monsey, New York. Rabbi Yechiel Steinmetz's eruv was functional only for that summer.

Silver Lake Dam was listed on the National Register of Historic Places in 2000.

Notable former hotels in Woodridge

Palms Hotel
Olympic Hotel
Avon Lodge
Glory Hotel
Hotel Israel (Fischel Kleinberg's)
Vegetarian Hotel (Konviser family)
The Biltmore
Sunny Oaks
The Claremore Country Club
Sunny Acres Dude Ranch
The Rosemond
The Alamac Country Club
Rubinstein's Hotel
Saperstein's Bungalow's
Hotel Weingerson
Shein's Hotel

Government
Mayor- Joan Collins
Trustees- Ronald Kates, Yits Kantrowitz, Leni Binder, and Steve Levy
Village Clerk- Myra Bennett
Village Justice- Eddie Hernandez
Acting Village Justice- Bart Rasnick
Justice Court Clerk- Amanda Dole

Geography
Woodridge is located at  (41.708062, -74.569809). Woodridge is bordered by the Hamlet of Fallsburg or Old Falls, the Hamlet of Mountaindale, and the Hamlet of Glen Wild.

Demographics

As of the census of 2000, there were 902 people, 351 households, and 228 families residing in the village. The population density was 583.9 people per square mile (226.1/km2). There were 473 housing units at an average density of 306.2 per square mile (118.6/km2). The racial makeup of the village was 72.84% White, 12.42% African American, 0.22% Native American, 1.00% Asian, 0.22% Pacific Islander, 8.98% from other races, and 4.32% from two or more races. Hispanic or Latino of any race were 23.61% of the population.

There were 351 households, out of which 33.3% had children under the age of 18 living with them, 41.0% were married couples living together, 16.2% had a female householder with no husband present, and 35.0% were non-families. 30.8% of all households were made up of individuals, and 15.1% had someone living alone who was 65 years of age or older. The average household size was 2.50 and the average family size was 3.10.

In the village, the population was spread out, with 27.3% under the age of 18, 7.1% from 18 to 24, 25.3% from 25 to 44, 22.4% from 45 to 64, and 18.0% who were 65 years of age or older. The median age was 39 years. For every 100 females, there were 89.9 males. For every 100 females age 18 and over, there were 86.9 males.

The median income for a household in the village was $23,750, and the median income for a family was $29,167. Males had a median income of $30,357 versus $25,694 for females. The per capita income for the village was $14,993. About 25.4% of families and 31.1% of the population were below the poverty line, including 40.9% of those under age 18 and 24.4% of those age 65 or over.

References

Villages in New York (state)
Fallsburg, New York
Villages in Sullivan County, New York